Bloodcult is an EP by the Dutch death metal band Nembrionic. It was released in 1997 as a split CD with Consolation's debut album Beautyfilth by Displeased Records. The first two tracks are demos of incomplete songs of the Incomplete album. Three of the last four tracks are from  the Themes of an Occult Theory EP, which was released under the name Nembrionic Hammerdeath. The song "Bloodcult" is exclusively on this release.

Track listing
  "Warfare Noise"  (1:59)  (Demo version)
  "Corroded"  (2:06)  (Demo version)
  "Bloodcult"  (4:06)  
  "Yog Sototh"  (3:02)  
  "Approach to Coincide"  (4:03)  
  "Against God"  (3:32)  
  "Confrontation with Terror"  (1:41)

Credits
 Jamil Berud - Bass
 Dennis Jak - Guitar
 Noel Derek Rule Van Eersel - Drums
 Marco ("Bor") Westenbrink - Guitar, vocals

Nembrionic albums
1997 EPs